The women's 4 × 400 metres relay at the 2017 Asian Athletics Championships was held on 9 July. India won the race, but were later disqualified when Nirmala Sheoran was sanctioned for doping.

Results
Source:

References

2017 Asian Athletics Championships
Relays at the Asian Athletics Championships